(), also known as Cloud collar in English and sometimes referred as châr-qâb, is a Chinese term which can either to a four-lobed motif (more rarely an 8-lobed motif), or to a  traditional Chinese garment accessory item in , the Traditional clothing of the Han Chinese, which is typically found in the form of a detachable collar with cloud patterns and is worn over the shoulders area, similar to a shawl. The  could also be applied directly on garments, where it would fall around the collar of robes onto the chest and shoulder region,or as a clothing appliqué. In China, the  has both ceremonial and practical uses when used in clothing. In Henan, brides would wear  decorated with hanging ribbons and bells. It also had the practical use of preventing clothing from being dirty and oily by covering up the clothes and by covering up the stains. The  is used in Peranakan wedding; the multi-layered  worn by Chinese (and Chinese descents) brides on the day of their wedding is sometimes known as "phoenix collar". The  also started to be worn by the Non-Chinese, the Tartars of northern China and Manchuria in the later medieval period.  

The  motif was also used in Chinese ceramic work around the necks of vases and jars; mainly in the ceramics of the Yuan, Ming, and Qing dynasty period. It was used to decorate blue and white porcelain.

Terminology 
The cloud collar is named after the shape of the collar's lobes, which looks like a 'quadruple-cloud' in design when laid flat.

Cultural significance and symbolism

Chinese cosmology 
The  motif was originally used as a cosmic symbol in China.

In Chinese clothing 
When used on Chinese clothing, the cloud shape is a symbolism which represent abundance while the neck opening is a symbolism for the "Sky gate" (i.e. the entrance to heaven). The lobes which point in 4-directions (typically) represents the universe. 

In the Song dynasty, the human body was perceived as the "axis column of the universe" and was considered an extension from the earth to the sky since the post-Han dynasty period while a robe was considered as the "enveloping canopy of the Universe" which is the sky. The hole around at the neck of the sky-resembling robe may be been perceived as a symbolism of the "Sky gate" through which the axis column (i.e. the human body) is believed to penetrate through the "Sky gate".

In Qing dynasty, this cosmological concept was maintained and could be seen in the cloud-studded upper part of the clothing, especially on the dragon robes. On the dragon robes, the  represented the sky which was supported on the world; the world was represented by the motifs of mountains and seas which were decorating the base of the dragon robe.

In the recent centuries, the  motif has been mainly perceived as a purely decorative motif. In the late Ming and Qing dynasties, the cosmological was largely forgotten as the people became more materialistic, and by then, the  motif became mainly an ornamental design. The number of lobes were sometimes 3, 5, 6, 8 instead of the traditional use of the 4-lobes.

Origins 
The origins of the  appears to have been derived from multiple origins. There are also several hypothesis on their origins.According to Schuyler Cammann, the origins of  motif is derived from the cosmological decorations which ornated the back of mirrors of the Han dynasty. The earliest forms of the  motif appeared on the Chinese bronze mirrors found at the end of the Zhou dynasty (c. 4th and 3rd centuries BC). However, the Zhou dynasty  motif was not fully evolved; it was only during the Eastern Han dynasty (c. 1st century AD) that the  motif evolved fully. 

The  motif may also have been derived from persimmon calyx pattern, which may have been called  pattern, a flower pattern with 4 petals with each petal showing a different direction) used in lacquer and bronze wares of the Han dynasty. The persimmon calyx pattern originated in the Warring States Period and prevailed in the Han dynasty. The  motif appears to have later been adapted to develop the actual garment collar.

Garment collar

Sui and Tang dynasties 
The  as a form of garment collar was developed in the Sui dynasty from a feather coat. Other sources indicate however that it first appeared in the Tang dynasty and was an element of the Chinese court dress since Tang dynasty.  In the Tang dynasty, the pattern of 4-petal leaf which was used in the  motif changed in details and became a cross flower and thus developed in the usual pattern which would decorate on fabrics.

Song and Jin dynasties 

The  appears to have already been known in China as early as the Song dynasty and since then, they have used extensively in their robes patterns. Till the Song dynasty, the design of the  shows the combination of persimmon calyx motif and the ruyi clouds (auspicious clouds); this was also used in architecture of the Song dynasty. The  clouds patterns can be found as early as in the bronze wares of the Shang and Zhou dynasties and they became popular in the Han dynasty.The  also had origins in the Jin dynasty, where it is attested that it was first used on robes in literature. The first pictorial evidence of the  pattern usage on robes is from the Jin dynasty in the painting Lady Wenji Returns to Han while the term "" (雲肩) was also first document in the Jin shi in the description of the Jin dynasty imperial dress. According to the Jinshi: "Titled and royal lady and imperial relatives ... granted imperial carriage and dressings for carriage with sun and moon decorated on left and right of cloud shoulders, dragon pattern in yellow, saddle with five holes need to be changed”. The imperial dress was also described to be yellow imperial robe decorated with dragon motifs which is worn with a  decorated with the sun and moon.

Mongol period and Yuan dynasty 
Prior to the conquest of the Song dynasty, the Mongols had already adopted the wearing of  motifs. However according to the History of Yuan, the clothing system of the Yuan originated from the Jin dynasty; "when the Yuan dynasty was founded, clothing and carriage decorations followed the old customs. Kublai Khan took the customs from the Jin and Song dynasty to the Han and Tang dynasty".

The  motif was popular in the Yuan dynasty and became a signature motif on both men's and women's clothing and could also be found on both ceramic and metal work. In the Yuan dynasty painting Khubilai Khan Hunting, Empress Chabi is depicted wearing a white robe which is decorated with a cloud-collar motif on her chest and shoulders. Some of the attendant also wore Mongol robes with the  motif. The Yuan dynasty  pattern consisted of a 4-lobed cruciform-shaped design and would be found around the robe's collar covering the chest and shoulders areas. The Yuan dynasty  motif was the combination of ruyi-clouds, persimmon calyx motif and bo, which was used to protect the necks of northern nomads from winds and sand; this also developed into the yunjian pattern which was used to decorate the shoulder region of clothing and became widely used in the clothing of nobles. In the Medieval periods, the  motif appears to have been derived from the eight-petal lotus and the Buddhist Mandala. The  no more appeared on the official robes after the fall of the Yuan dynasty in China proper.

Ming dynasty 

In Ming dynasty, the  garment collar appears to have been popular in both China and Mongolia in this period. The 4-lobed cloud collar continued to be work around the collars of the Ming dynasty ceremonial robe.

Qing dynasty 

The  survived into the Qing dynasty period and was used in Chinese women's clothing. It became very popular and it could be found many forms and styles. 

The  could be sometimes be used as a detachable collar or could be found woven into the women's robe. The practical use and the ceremonial associations of the  may have contributed to the use of  appliqué on the ao or shan (i.e. a type of Chinese jackets) in the 19th century.In Qing, the  became an indispensable item for women's wedding clothing, and by the 19th century, it was an important central element to the Han Chinese women's celebratory clothing. The  worn by the Han Chinese as ceremonial clothing and for wedding was a detachable collar which was worn on top of the mang ao (i.e. the dragon jacket) and the Qing dynasty xiapei (a type of stole).

Republic of China 

The  continued to appear in the Chinese robes during the Republic of China.

21st century 

In the 21st century, modern  started to be used to ornate the modern hanfu; however, it has gradually lost its original cultural significance.

Chinese opera costumes 

The  was also worn in women Chinese opera costumes.

Chinese ceramics 

The use of the cloud collar motif on ceramic works appears to more commonly on the Ming dynasty ceramics although this ceramic design could have already been developed during the Yuan dynasty. The cloud collar motif used around the necks of Chinese jars and vases could have been derived from the cloud collar (clothing item) or may have been developed independently from the actual collar as the jars and vases were themselves perceived as a miniature version of the universe.

Influences and derivatives

Clothing

Islamic Cultural sphere 
During the Mongol invasion of Eurasia, the Mongols brought new artistic concepts to the Islamic cultural sphere, including Persia, and in Central Asia. It continued to appears in the arts of the Timurid (1370–1507) and Safavid (1501–1736) period.

In the Babur-náma, the cloud collar is referred as châr-qâb, which was either a garment or a shawl which was bestowed to its wearer as a mark of rank.  The châr-qâb with four-lobed, either woven or embroidered with gold thread, was often seen as a garment motif in Timurid paintings and was associated with the Turkic rulers of Central Asia. The Timurid court had sent items to the Chinese court which was accepted as tributes. The Chinese also sent a  made of gold brocade with tiger design, as well as royal robes and garments, to Sharukh. 

Drawings of cloud collars were also produced in western Iran during the second half of the 1400s under the patronage of the Turkmen; the drawing traditional was developed through the interactions with the Chinese models.

Nestorian art 
Some Nestorian arts depict the cloud collar; for example, a Nestorian headstone which was discovered at the site of Xia Shrine (a district once reserve for Muslim and Christian burial) depict an angel dressed in Mongol style wearing a yunjian.

Japan 
The Chinese cloud collar was also introduced in the arts of Japan where it is depicted on the image of the bodhisattva Manjusri.

Southeast Asia 
In Southeast Asia, the Chinese yunjian appears to have directly influenced the scalloped collars which are one of the most prominent features on Southeast Asian aristocratic ceremonial clothing, and in particular, the court dancers clothing. These Southeast Asian cloud collar, which are also worn around the breasts and collar area, are ornamented with gold and silver, with embroidery, and contained gold leaf glue-work; they are often styled in Indianized forms of jewellery while the gold and silver decorations on the collars (especially found in the Malay Peninsula, Sumatra, and Java) are the results of the Chinese influence and Chinese craftsmanship.
In Thailand, the Thai royal and theatrical clothing also included a form of cloud collar-like ornament which form peaked at the shoulders.

In Burma, the Burmese officials used to wear court clothing which contained a tiered and peaked cloud collar.

The Indonesian lengkung léhér (i.e. a ceremonial collar) worn by Palembang brides and court dancers, and similar cloud collars worn in the Malay peninsula appears to be a reflection of the historical presence of the Chinese brides in the Malay court. 

The Peranakan Chinese brides wear cloud collars, which is sometimes referred as the "phoenix collar", as part of their wedding set of attire. The phoenix collar is multi-layered and the overlapping layers are movable which represent the feathers of a phoenix. The Peranakans are the descendants of the late 15th and 16th century AD Chinese traders who brought their culture to Southeast Asia, including Chinese traditions and clothing. The phoenix is the symbol of the empress and is an auspicious symbol for the Peranakan community. Following the Malay tradition, the couples were allowed to be treated like royalty on the day of their wedding.

The Chinese yunjian was also worn by the Chinese immigrants in Java in 1900s.

Ceramics 
Some Mexican artists borrowed the cloud collar motif which was frequently used on the Chinese vases and adapted it in their own ceramic work. This can be seen from a Mexican vase dating from the late 17th-18th century where the Mexican artist expanded the cloud collar motif until it almost covered the entire surface of the vase.

See also 

 Fashion in Yuan dynasty
 Hanfu
 Hanfu accessories
Chinese clothing
List of Chinese symbols, designs, and art motifs

References 

Chinese traditional clothing
Chinese art
Chinese folk art
Visual motifs 
Ornaments